Voraptus is a genus of spiders in the family Miturgidae.

Species
, the World Spider Catalog accepted the following species:
Voraptus aerius Simon, 1898 – Congo
Voraptus affinis Lessert, 1925 – South Africa
Voraptus exilipes (Lucas, 1858) – Gabon
Voraptus extensus Lessert, 1916 – East Africa
Voraptus orientalis Hogg, 1919 – Sumatra
Voraptus tenellus (Simon, 1893) (type species) – Seychelles

References

Miturgidae
Araneomorphae genera
Spiders of Africa